Qezel Hesar-e Bala (also Romanized as Qezel Ḩeşār-e Bālā; also known as Qezel Ḩeşār-e ‘Olyā) is a village in Golestan Rural District, in the Central District of Jajrom County, North Khorasan Province, Iran. At the 2006 census, its population was 126, in 32 families.

References 

Populated places in Jajrom County